Eugeroics (originally "eugrégorique" or "eugregoric"), also known as wakefulness-promoting agents and wakefulness-promoting drugs, are a class of drugs that promote wakefulness and alertness. They are medically indicated for the treatment of certain sleep disorders including excessive daytime sleepiness (EDS) in narcolepsy or obstructive sleep apnea (OSA). Eugeroics are also often prescribed off-label for the treatment of EDS in idiopathic hypersomnia. In contrast to classical psychostimulants, such as methylphenidate and amphetamine, which are also used in the treatment of these disorders, eugeroics typically do not produce euphoria, and, consequently, have a lower addictive potential.

Modafinil and armodafinil are each thought to act as selective, weak, atypical dopamine reuptake inhibitors (DRI), whereas adrafinil acts as a prodrug for modafinil. Other eugeroics include solriamfetol, which acts as a norepinephrine–dopamine reuptake inhibitor (NDRI), and pitolisant, which acts as a histamine 3 (H3) receptor antagonist/inverse agonist.

Examples

Marketed
 Armodafinil (Nuvigil)
 Modafinil (Provigil)
 Pitolisant (Wakix)
 Solriamfetol (Sunosi)

Discontinued
 Adrafinil

Never marketed
 Flmodafinil (CRL-40,940)
 Fluorafinil (CRL-40,941)
 Fluorenol
 Methylbisfluoromodafinil
2-Phenyl-3-aminobutane

In development
 Selective orexin receptor agonists (two are currently under development by Takeda, danavorexton and TAK-994)
CE-123 is under patent by Red Bull.

References

Drug classes defined by psychological effects
Nootropics